Christian Ried (born 24 February 1979) is a German racing driver who currently competes in the FIA World Endurance Championship.

Career
Ried's father Gerold founded Proton Competition in 1996, the team which Christian has spent most of his career racing for, beginning with the FIA GT Championship in 1999. As of 2021, Christian was team owner, facilitating the team's move to the WeatherTech SportsCar Championship alongside WeatherTech Racing in 2021. Ried ran his first 24 Hours of Le Mans in 2006, driving in the GT2 class for Sebah Automotive Ltd. He returned in 2011, driving for Proton Competition, and scored his first podium in 2014, finishing second in the GTE Am class. Four years later, Ried collected his first victory at the famous race, winning the GTE Am class alongside co-drivers Matt Campbell and Julien Andlauer. Two years later, Ried finished runner-up once again, this time with Riccardo Pera replacing Andlauer in the driver lineup. That same year, Ried won the European Le Mans Series championship in the GTE class on countback, after ending level on points with Kessel Racing.

In 2017 and 2018, Ried won the Porsche Cup, an award handed out to a non-factory driver who has most successfully piloted a Porsche over the course of the season.

Ried is the only driver to have competed in every race of the first decade of the FIA World Endurance Championship, spanning from 2012 to 2022. His streak is still active as of the 2023 season.

Personal Life
His son Jonas, is currently competing in Formula 4.

Racing record

Racing career summary

† As Ried was a guest driver, he was ineligible to score championship points.

Complete Intercontinental Le Mans Cup results
(key) (Races in bold indicate pole position; races in italics indicate fastest lap)

Complete FIA World Endurance Championship results
(key) (Races in bold indicate pole position; races in italics indicate fastest lap)

* Season still in progress.

Complete 24 Hours of Le Mans results

References

1979 births
Living people
German racing drivers
Sports car racing team owners
24 Hours of Le Mans drivers
FIA World Endurance Championship drivers
European Le Mans Series drivers
FIA GT Championship drivers
American Le Mans Series drivers
Rolex Sports Car Series drivers
24H Series drivers
Asian Le Mans Series drivers
KCMG drivers
Nürburgring 24 Hours drivers
People from Schöneberg